The Ven. Henry Edward FitzHerbert, MA (29 December 1882-23 April 1958) was Archdeacon of Derby from 1943  to 1952.

He was educated at Charterhouse School and Trinity Hall, Cambridge 
and  ordained deacon in 1912 and priest in 1913. His first post was as a Curate at Blidworth. After a curacy at Blidworth he was Rector of Thrapston and Rural Dean of Higham Ferrers. After further Incumbencies in Benefield, Flaunden, Netherseal and Weston-on-Trent he became an Honorary Chaplain to the King in 1940; and continued (as Honorary Chaplain to the Queen after 1952) until 1955.

Notes

1882 births
People educated at Charterhouse School
Alumni of Trinity Hall, Cambridge
Archdeacons of Derby
Honorary Chaplains to the King
1958 deaths